The 52nd Filmfare Awards South ceremony honouring the winners and nominees of the best of South Indian cinema in films released 2004 is an event that was at the Gachibowli Stadium, Hyderabad on 23 July 2005.

Main awards
Winners are listed first, highlighted in boldface.

Kannada cinema

Malayalam cinema

Tamil cinema

Telugu cinema

Technical Awards

Special awards

References

General
 51st Annual Manikchand Filmfare Award winners

External links
 
 

Filmfare Awards South
2005 Indian film awards